Lincoln Fillmore is a Republican Senator for Utah State's 17th Senate District and, prior to redistricting, its 10th Senate District. He was appointed by Governor Gary Herbert to fill a vacant seat caused by the resignation of Aaron Osmond.

Fillmore is the President of Charter Solutions, where he overseas a team of school business administrators that work on-site at various charter schools throughout the state. He is a 50 percent shareholder of Plexus Partners, a consulting firm, and a 25 percent shareholder of Endeavor Education, an organization that helps new and expanding groups establish charter schools. He is the owner and operator of a Nothing Bundt Cakes franchise retail bakery in Taylorsville.

Early life, education, and career 
Lincoln was born in Salt Lake County and lived there until he was a teenager, then being when his family moved to a town near San Francisco. While living in California as teenager, Lincoln wrote a conservative news column for his town's newspaper. He also ran for city council at the age of 18. At the age of 21 Lincoln moved back to Utah. Once back in Utah Lincoln got a degree from the University of Utah in Mass Communications. He has spent his professional career working in education as a teacher, principal, and as a school business manager. He is the president of the company Charter Solutions.

Political career 
Senator Fillmore serves is the Senator of district 10 in Utah. Before being appointed to the Senate in 2016, he served as a county and state delegate for the Republican Party. He also has been a precinct, legislative, and regional chair for the party. Senator Fillmore is currently up for reelection because he was appointed to fill the last year of Senator Osmond's term. He currently has two challengers in the primary.

Committees that Senator Fillmore was on in the 2016 legislative session: 
 Social Services Appropriations Subcommittee
 Senate Economic Development and Workforce Services Committee
 Senate Education Committee

Legislation

2016 sponsored bills

Notable legislation 
In the 2016 legislative session Senator Fillmore passed a bill that requires those who receive public assistance to take two hours of self-reliance training a week.

References

External links 
 Lincoln Fillmore Campaign Website
 Utah Senate Page
 Biography Project Vote Smart

Living people
Republican Party Utah state senators
21st-century American politicians
Year of birth missing (living people)